Julen Lopetegui Agote (born 28 August 1966) is a Spanish former professional footballer, currently manager of Premier League club Wolverhampton Wanderers.

A goalkeeper, he played 149 La Liga matches over nine seasons, representing Real Madrid, Logroñés, Barcelona and Rayo Vallecano in the competition. He added 168 appearances in the Segunda División for three clubs, winning one cap for Spain and being a member of the squad at the 1994 World Cup.

Lopetegui started working as a manager in 2003, and spent several years in charge of Spain's youth teams, leading the under-19 and under-21 sides to European titles. He was also head coach of the senior national team for two years, but was dismissed before the start of the 2018 World Cup following the announcement of his agreement to join Real Madrid after the tournament. In club football, he has managed Rayo Vallecano, Castilla, Porto, Real Madrid and Sevilla, winning the 2020 Europa League with the latter side.

Playing career

Club
Born in Asteasu, Gipuzkoa, Lopetegui started his professional career at local Real Sociedad. In 1985, he accepted an offer from Real Madrid, where the 19-year-old played in the B team.

After a loan spell at UD Las Palmas Lopetegui returned, but could never dislodge another veteran, Francisco Buyo, only managing one La Liga appearance during two seasons, a 3–3 away draw against Atlético Madrid as Real were already crowned league champions. He subsequently signed with CD Logroñés, being instrumental as the modest Riojan club consistently managed to retain its top-flight status.

When Andoni Zubizarreta left for Valencia CF in 1994, Lopetegui joined FC Barcelona, battling – and losing – for first-choice status with longtime understudy Carles Busquets. After the Catalans bought FC Porto's Vítor Baía he was further demoted to third string, and returned to Madrid with Segunda División club Rayo Vallecano in 1997.

Lopetegui was a starter in his first two seasons at Rayo, culminating with their play-off final win over CF Extremadura in June 1999. After returning to the top tier he lost his place to American international Kasey Keller and then Imanol Etxeberria; he played 36 top-flight games from 1999 to 2002. He was nonetheless favoured for the team's run to the quarter-finals of the UEFA Cup in 2000–01, where they were eliminated by compatriots Deportivo Alavés. He retired at the age of 36.

International
Lopetegui's performances at Logroñés earned him his sole cap with Spain, coming on as a substitute for Zubizarreta for the final 30 minutes of a 0–2 friendly loss to Croatia in Valencia, on 23 March 1994. He was subsequently picked for the squad at that year's FIFA World Cup.

Coaching career

Beginnings
Lopetegui was one of Spain coach Juan Santisteban's assistants at the 2003 UEFA European Under-17 Championship. After the tournament, he had his first head coaching spell at Rayo, with the club in the second level, but was sacked after the tenth match of the 2003–04 campaign, which ended in relegation to division three. After working as a sports commentator, including for LaSexta in the 2006 FIFA World Cup, he returned to coaching, with Real Madrid Castilla, who he played for in the 1980s, now in the third tier.

From 2010 to 2014, Lopetegui worked with the Spanish youth teams, winning the 2012 European Under-19 Championship and the 2013 Under-21 Championship. He left the Royal Spanish Football Federation on 30 April 2014, following the expiration of his contract.

Porto

Lopetegui returned to club duties on 6 May 2014, being appointed at Portugal's FC Porto. He signed seven Spanish players to the club that summer.

In his first season at the Estádio do Dragão, with the club's biggest budget ever, Lopetegui led them to the quarter-finals of the UEFA Champions League, where they equalled the club's biggest defeat in European competitions losing 6–1 against FC Bayern Munich (having lost by the same score to AEK Athens FC in 1978). He failed to win any silverware, contributing to the longest drought during Jorge Nuno Pinto da Costa's presidency.

On 8 January 2016, after a 1–3 home loss to C.S. Marítimo in the Taça da Liga, as Porto had already been eliminated from the Champions League and was ranked third in the domestic league after an away loss and a home draw, Lopetegui was relieved of his duties and replaced by Rui Barros. A week later, the club announced that it had terminated the former's contract unilaterally.

Spain
On 21 July 2016, after being strongly linked to English side Wolverhampton Wanderers which was under new ownership, Lopetegui was announced as the new manager of the Spain national team following Vicente del Bosque's retirement. In his first match in charge, on 1 September, he led them to a 2–0 friendly victory over Belgium at the King Baudouin Stadium; the nation qualified for the 2018 World Cup, winning nine and drawing one of their group matches.

On 12 June 2018, with the team already in Russia for the tournament, it was announced that Lopetegui would take over as the head coach of Real Madrid on a three-year contract after the conclusion of Spain's involvement at the World Cup. The following day, he was dismissed from his job with the national team and replaced by Fernando Hierro.

Real Madrid
Lopetegui's first competitive game in charge took place on 15 August 2018, in a 4–2 loss to rivals Atlético Madrid in the UEFA Super Cup after extra time. He thus became the second Real manager to start his tenure by conceding four goals, after Englishman Michael Keeping who began in 1948 being downed 4–1 by RC Celta de Vigo.

Following a string of bad results and, ultimately, a 5–1 away defeat to Barcelona in El Clásico on 28 October 2018, Lopetegui was fired a day later, being replaced by Santiago Solari.

Sevilla
On 5 June 2019, Lopetegui was appointed as the new Sevilla FC manager on a three-year contract. In his first year, they finished fourth to qualify for the Champions League, and on 21 August they defeated Inter Milan 3–2 in the 2020 UEFA Europa League Final, his first club honour.

Lopetegui agreed to a further two-year extension on 10 January 2021. On 5 October 2022, however, following five losses in eight matches in the new season – the last being 4–1 at home against Borussia Dortmund in the Champions League – he was dismissed.

Wolverhampton Wanderers
After leaving Sevilla, Lopetegui was interviewed by Wolverhampton, who had recently dismissed Bruno Lage, but he initially turned down the offer due to his 92-year-old father's ill health. He was approached again and, on 5 November 2022, announced he would become the club's new head coach effective 14 November. On his competitive debut on 20 December, his team defeated EFL League Two side Gillingham 2–0 at home in the fourth round of the EFL Cup; this put them into the last eight for the first time since 1995–96. Six days later, on his Premier League bow, they won 2–1 at Everton with a last-minute Rayan Aït-Nouri goal, and the manager thereby became the first at the club to win his opening match in the top flight since John Barnwell in 1978.

Managerial statistics

Honours

Player
Real Madrid
La Liga: 1989–90

Barcelona
Supercopa de España: 1994, 1996

Spain U20
FIFA World Youth Championship runner-up: 1985

Manager
Real Madrid
UEFA Super Cup runner-up: 2018

Sevilla
UEFA Europa League: 2019–20
UEFA Super Cup runner-up: 2020

Spain U19
UEFA European Under-19 Championship: 2012

Spain U21
UEFA European Under-21 Championship: 2013

References

External links

1966 births
Living people
People from Tolosaldea
Spanish footballers
Footballers from the Basque Country (autonomous community)
Association football goalkeepers
La Liga players
Segunda División players
Real Madrid Castilla footballers
Real Madrid CF players
UD Las Palmas players
CD Logroñés footballers
FC Barcelona players
Rayo Vallecano players
Spain under-21 international footballers
Spain international footballers
1994 FIFA World Cup players
Basque Country international footballers
Spanish football managers
La Liga managers
Segunda División managers
Segunda División B managers
Rayo Vallecano managers
Real Madrid Castilla managers
Real Madrid CF managers
Sevilla FC managers
Primeira Liga managers
FC Porto managers
Premier League managers
Wolverhampton Wanderers F.C. managers
UEFA Europa League winning managers
Spain national under-21 football team managers
Spain national football team managers
Spanish expatriate football managers
Expatriate football managers in Portugal
Expatriate football managers in England
Spanish expatriate sportspeople in Portugal
Spanish expatriate sportspeople in England